Schmollensee station is a railway station in the municipality of Pudagla, located in the Vorpommern-Greifswald district in Mecklenburg-Vorpommern, Germany.

Notable places nearby
Schmollensee

References

External links

Railway stations in Mecklenburg-Western Pomerania
Buildings and structures in Vorpommern-Greifswald
Usedom
Railway stations in Germany opened in 1943